Thường Xuân is a district (huyện) of Thanh Hóa province in the North Central Coast region of Vietnam.

As of 2003 the district had a population of 88,162 . The district covers an area of 918 km². The district capital lies at Thường Xuân.

References

Districts of Thanh Hóa province